Sidney Horley Stanton (16 June 1923 – 20 February 2005) was an English professional footballer who played in the Football League for Northampton Town. He played as a defender or wing half.

Stanton was born in Dudley, which was then part of Worcestershire, in 1923. He began his football career with Birmingham City, and played in the various wartime competitions during the Second World War, but made no first-team appearances once competitive football resumed after the war. He moved on to Northampton Town, where he made seven appearances in the Third Division South between 1947 and 1949. In 1949 he joined Headington United, newly admitted to the Southern League, where he spent two seasons, making 51 appearances in all first-team competitions. Stanton died in 2005.

References

1923 births
2005 deaths
Sportspeople from Dudley
English footballers
Association football wing halves
Birmingham City F.C. players
Northampton Town F.C. players
Oxford United F.C. players
English Football League players
Southern Football League players